The Oltschiburg is a mountain of the Bernese Alps Switzerland, overlooking Lake Brienz in the Bernese Oberland. It lies on the chain that lies north of the Grosse Scheidegg and that culminates at the Schwarzhorn. The closest locality is Axalp. The elevation of oltschiburg is at 2237 meters (7,329 feet) with a Prominence of 1010 feet.

References

External links
 Oltschiburg on Hikr

Mountains of the Alps
Mountains of Switzerland
Mountains of the canton of Bern
Two-thousanders of Switzerland